Hemery or Hémery is a surname that originated in France.

People
Victor Hémery (1876–1950), French racecar driver

References

See also
 Hemery (disambiguation)